RA4 may refer to:

 The RA-4 process, a photographic print process
 (11835) 1985 RA4, a minor planet
 RA4 an untrimmed paper size slightly larger than A4